Superboy is the name of several American comic book series published by DC Comics, featuring characters of the same name. The first three Superboy titles feature the original Superboy, the underaged version of the legendary hero Superman.  Later series feature the second Superboy, who is a partial clone of Superman.

Publication history

Volume 1 (1949-1977)
The first series featured the original Superboy, a teenage incarnation of the Man of Steel.  It began publication in 1949, four years after the character's debut in More Fun Comics #101 (January 1945). The majority of the stories were set in the rural town of Smallville during the character's youth, including tales of his toddlerhood. Comics historian Les Daniels noted that "Many early Superboy stories seemed devoted to extolling the virtues of life in America's small towns, and covers made Smallville look like a dreamworld where few problems existed...Indeed, the early Superboy might fairly be called the Saturday Evening Post of comic books." The supporting cast included Superboy's adoptive parents Jonathan and Martha Kent, his over-inquisitive classmate and neighbor Lana Lang, best friend Pete Ross who was secretly aware of Superboy's true identity as Clark Kent, Smallville Police Chief Parker, and the super-powered canine Krypto.  With the exception of a teenage Lex Luthor, who was a frequent foe of the Boy of Steel, almost none of the featured villains appeared more than once. Fuzzy, the Krypto Mouse, a character who appeared in a single story in Superboy #65 (June 1958), inspired a similar character created by writer Art Baltazar in 2012. Bizarro debuted in Superboy #68 (Oct. 1958). For much of this period, DC also published Superboy tales in Adventure Comics, which began featuring the Boy of Steel regularly in issue #103 (April 1946). In 1962, Superboy was the second best selling comic book in the United States, surpassed only by Superman  in sales.

The Legion of Super-Heroes starred in their own backup feature starting with #172 (March 1971). Nick Cardy was the cover artist for Superboy for issues #182–198 and 200–206. Dave Cockrum began drawing the Legion feature with issue #184 (April 1972), again increasing the team's popularity. Wildfire made his first appearance as ERG-1 in the Legion back-up feature in issue #195.  With issue #197 (September 1973), the Legion became permanent co-stars, and the cover logo became "Superboy starring the Legion of Super-Heroes" while the title of the book itself remained Superboy. Crafted by Cary Bates and Cockrum, the feature proved popular and saw such events as the wedding of Bouncing Boy and Duo Damsel in issue #200 (Feb 1974). Issues #202 (June 1974) and #205 (Dec. 1974) of the series were in the 100 Page Super Spectacular format. Cockrum was replaced on art by Mike Grell as of issue #203 (August 1974) which featured the death of Invisible Kid. With issue #222 (Dec. 1976), the cover logo became "Superboy and the Legion of Super-Heroes" and the book's title itself followed with issue #231 (Sept. 1977).  The character Dawnstar was introduced in issue #226 (April 1977). A backup story in issue #236 served as a lead-in to All-New Collectors' Edition #C-55 which featured the wedding of longtime Legion members Saturn Girl and Lightning Lad. Writer Paul Levitz and artists James Sherman and Joe Staton crafted "Earthwar" a five-issue storyline in Superboy and the Legion of Super-Heroes #241–245 (July–Nov. 1978). A story originally scheduled to appear in DC Special Series was split apart and published in Superboy and the Legion of Super-Heroes #250-251 due to the DC Implosion. Starting with issue #259 (Jan. 1980), the title was changed to Legion of Super-Heroes (volume 2), and the Boy of Steel left the team and the book. Though Superboy later rejoined, he made only occasional appearances in the series that once bore his name, and the series remained a Legion book until its last issue, Tales of the Legion of Super-Heroes #354 (Dec. 1987).

The New Adventures of Superboy (1980-1984)
The second series was actually titled The New Adventures of Superboy. It was launched to provide readers with monthly Smallville-based Superboy tales, which had largely disappeared after the Legion became co-stars of the original Superboy title, before re-emerging for brief stints in Adventure Comics and Superman Family between 1977-1979. The series continued monthly publication for a total of 54 issues, with virtually all issues being pencilled by longtime Lois Lane artist Kurt Schaffenberger. Issue #50 (Feb. 1984) featured a Legion of Super-Heroes guest appearance with Keith Giffen splitting the story's art duties with Schaffenberger.

Superboy Spectacular #1 (cover dated March 1980) was DC's first direct sales-only title.

Briefly, the series also included "Dial H for Hero" back-up feature which told the story of Christopher King and Victoria Grant, two teenagers who could change into a variety of super heroes based on reader submissions. The feature was originally presented in Adventure Comics, but moved to Superboy shortly after Adventure Comics ended its run as a monthly comic.

Volume 2 (1989-1991)
The third series (Volume 2) is different from other Superman or Superboy titles in that it is set in the continuity of the Superboy television series, as opposed to the regular DC Universe (as the original Superboy was erased from mainstream DC continuity after the 1985 limited series Crisis on Infinite Earths, with Superman beginning his superhero career as an adult). Its intent was to explore some of the unseen tales and events that the TV series could not. The series originally carried the cover title Superboy: The Comic Book

Volume 4 (2010-2011)
A new Superboy series starring Kon-El debuted with a January 2011 cover date, written by Jeff Lemire and drawn by Pier Gallo. In the intervening time between series, Kon-El had been retconned to be the hybrid clone of Superman and Lex Luthor; Clark Kent's history as the original Superboy had also been restored to the main DC continuity. In this series, Kon-El, living under the secret identity of Conner Kent, lives with Martha Kent and Krypto in Smallville, the town he protects as the second Superboy. Superboy vol. 4 ended as a result of DC Comics relaunching their entire line of comics in September 2011.

Volume 5 (2011-2014)
As part of The New 52 relaunch in September 2011, the Superboy series began with a new first issue. This new series was written by Scott Lobdell and drawn by R. B. Silva and Rob Lean. It began with a new origin story for Kon-El where he was created by the secret organisation N.O.W.H.E.R.E. as a "living weapon", in a manner similar to the origin of Superboy from the then-ongoing Young Justice cartoon. Tom DeFalco began scripting the series over Lobdell's plots with issue #6 (April 2012) and became the full writer with issue #12 (October 2012). Kon-El's genetic donor in the new continuity was originally left ambiguous and hinted to be the same as before the reboot, but was eventually revealed to be Jon Lane Kent, the villainous future son of Superman and Lois Lane.

Justin Jordan became the new series writer with issue #20. Kon-El was seemingly killed in the crossover story "Krypton Returns"; beginning with issue #26 under new writer Marv Wolfman, Jon Lane Kent became the new series protagonist. Aaron Kuder took over as writer with issue #30. The series was cancelled with issue #34 (October 2014), with Kon-El returning in the finale.

Collected editions 
Legion of Super-Heroes Archives
Volume 1 includes Superboy #86, #89, and #98, 255 pages, 1991, 
Volume 3 includes Superboy #117, 224 pages, 1993, 
Volume 4 includes Superboy #124-125, 224 pages, 1994, 
Volume 8 includes Superboy #147, 240 pages, February 1999, 
Volume 10 collects Superboy #172-173, #183-184, #188, #190-191, #193, #195, #197-202, 232 pages, October 2000, 
Volume 11 collects Superboy #203-212, 224 pages, August 2001, 
Volume 12 collects Superboy #212-223, 240 pages, May 2003, 
Volume 13 collects Superboy #224-233, 240 pages, May 2012, 
Showcase Presents: The Legion of Super-Heroes
 Volume 1 includes Superboy #86, 89, 98, and 117, 560 pages, April 2007,  
 Volume 2 includes Superboy #117 and 125, 528 pages, April 2008, 
 Volume 4 includes Superboy  #172-173, 176, 183-184, 188, 190-191, 512 pages, October 2010,  
Superboy: The Greatest Team-Ups Ever Told includes Superboy #55, 63, 80, 121, 171, 182 and The New Adventures of Superboy #13, 168 pages, January 2010,  
The New 52
Superboy Volume 1: Incubation collects Superboy vol. 5 #1-7, 160 pages, August 2012, 
The Culling: Rise of the Ravagers collects Superboy vol. 5 #8-9; Legion Lost vol. 2 #8-9; Teen Titans vol. 4 #8-9, and Teen Titans Annual #1, 176 pages, January 2013, 
Superboy Volume 2: Extraction collects Superboy vol. 5 #0, #8-12; Teen Titans vol. 4 #10, 160 pages, Mayz 2013, 
Superboy Volume 3: Lost collects Superboy vol. 5 #13-19; Superboy Annual vol. 5 #1, 200 pages, December 2013
Superboy Volume 4: Blood and Steel collects Superboy vol. 5 #20-27, 160 pages, July 2014
Superboy Volume 5: Paradox collects Superboy vol. 5 #0, #28-34; Superboy: Future's End #1 232 pages, January 2015

See also
Adventure Comics
Superboy and the Ravers
Smallville#Comic books - tie-in to the Smallville television series

References

External links 

Superboy , The New Adventures of Superboy , Superboy vol. 2 , and Superboy vol. 3  at Mike's Amazing World of Comics
Superboy at the DC Database Project
  

Superboy
Superman titles
1949 comics debuts
1977 comics endings
1980 comics debuts
1984 comics endings
1990 comics debuts
1991 comics endings
1994 comics debuts
2002 comics endings
2010 comics debuts
2011 comics endings
2011 comics debuts
2014 comics endings
Child characters in comics
Comics based on television series
Comics by Arnold Drake
Comics by Paul Kupperberg
Comics spin-offs
DC Comics titles
Superhero comics